Masonic Building may refer to:

In the United States:
Mechanics Building/Masonic Building, Pueblo, Colorado, listed on the National Register of Historic Places (NRHP) in Pueblo County
 Masonic Building (Osceola, Iowa), NRHP-listed
 Masonic Building (Alexandria, Louisiana), listed on the NRHP in Rapides Parish
 Masonic Building (Newton, Massachusetts), in Middlesex County
 Masonic Building (Billings, Montana)
 Masonic Building (Fort Benton, Montana), listed on the NRHP in Chouteau County
 Masonic Building (Kerrville, Texas), listed on the NRHP in Kerr County, Texas

See also
Masonic Temple (disambiguation)
Masonic Lodge (disambiguation)
List of Masonic buildings